Major-General William Wilby CB (c.1820 - 15 December 1893) was the General Officer Commanding, Ceylon.

Military career
Wilby was commissioned as an ensign in the British Army on 27 May 1836. He saw action in the Crimean War and commanded the right wing of his regiment at Gujarat and Sindh during the Indian Rebellion in 1857. He was present at the Battle of Aroghee and at the Battle of Magdala in April 1868 during the British Expedition to Abyssinia and went on to be General Officer Commanding, Ceylon from 1879 to 1882. He afterwards served as colonel of the King's Own (Royal Lancaster Regiment) (1892–93).

References

1820 births
1893 deaths
General Officers Commanding, Ceylon
British Army generals
Companions of the Order of the Bath
British Army personnel of the Crimean War
British military personnel of the Indian Rebellion of 1857
British military personnel of the Abyssinian War
King's Own Royal Regiment officers